The 1901 Belmont Stakes was the 35th running of the Belmont Stakes. It was the 12th Belmont Stakes held at Morris Park Racecourse in Morris Park, New York and was run on May 23, 1901. The race drew three starters and was won by the heavily favored Commando whose winning time of 2:21 flat set a new record for the Belmont Stakes at the  miles distance on dirt. 

Bred and raced by James R. Keene, Commando easily won the race by a half length over the 1901 Preakness Stakes winner The Parader. Third place went to All Green who was never in the race from the start and wisely was not pushed by jockey Willie Shaw, finishing a further fifty lengths back.

For future U.S. Racing Hall of Fame trainer James G. Rowe Sr., it marked the third of his record eight wins in the Belmont Stakes.

Commando's Canadian-born jockey Henry Spencer earned his second of two career wins in the American Classics having won the 1900 Preakness Stakes aboard Hindus.

The 1901 Kentucky Derby was run on April 29 and the 1899 Preakness Stakes on May 28, five days after the Belmont.   

The 1919 Belmont Stakes would mark the first time the race would be recognized as the third leg of a U.S. Triple Crown series.

Results

 Winning breeder: James R. Keene (KY)

References

External links 
BelmontStakes.com

1901
 Morris Park Racecourse
1901 in horse racing
1901 in American sports
1901 in sports in New York City
Horse races in New York City